Jakhar is an Indian surname. It may refer to:
 Badri Ram Jakhar, Indian politician
 Balram Jakhar, Indian politician
 Geetika Jakhar, Indian wrestler
 Jagat Jakhar, Indian film actor
 Ramavtar Singh Jakhar, Indian volleyball player
 Sunil Kumar Jakhar, Indian politician

See also 
 Jakhar, Pakistan, in Gujrat district: divided into Jakhar Kalan and Jakhar Khurd
 Jakhar Imam Shah, town and union council of Dera Ghazi Khan District, Pakistan

Surnames
Indian surnames
Surnames of Indian origin
Punjabi-language surnames
Hindu surnames
Khatri clans
Khatri surnames